Justin is a city in Denton County, Texas, United States. The population was 4,409 in 2020. It is also an outer ring suburb of Fort Worth.

History
In 1848, approximately 70 followers of the French utopian socialist Étienne Cabet arrived in what is now Justin to found an Icarian community. The attempt failed.

Contrary to popular belief, the town is not named after or related to the Justin Boot Company. In January 1887 the community petitioned postal authorities for a post office to be named Justin, in honor of Justin Sherman, a chief engineer with the Santa Fe Railroad.

Justin once was a center of salvage companies, which buy property involved in fires and tornadoes and sell it for discounted prices. In the late 1970s Western wear became very popular, and the Wallace family's salvage operations began to focus on Western wear. The other two major salvage businesses closed, and the salvage industry disappeared.

The Texas Motor Speedway had a Justin mailing address until July 9, 2005. Because it is physically located in the city of Fort Worth, Justin had the opportunity to purchase the Texas Motor Speedway but at the time they did not have enough money to run and provide maintenance to the speedway, the United States Postal Service changed the mailing address to Fort Worth, Texas.

WFAA-TV, Channel 8, has operated a 750 kilowatt Doppler weather radar out of Justin since January 25, 1995.

One of the FBI Ten Most Wanted Fugitives, Yaser Abdel Said, was captured in Justin on August 26, 2020.

Geography

Some areas along FM 156 and Hwy 114 use the Justin ZIP code (76247) even though the land is within the city of Fort Worth.

The climate in this area is characterized by hot, humid summers and generally mild to cool winters.  According to the Köppen Climate Classification system, Justin has a humid subtropical climate, abbreviated "Cfa" on climate maps.

Demographics

As of the 2020 United States census, there were 4,409 people, 1,610 households, and 1,129 families residing in the city.

Education
Justin is within the Northwest Independent School District. Residents are zoned to Justin Elementary School, Gene Pike Middle School, and Northwest High School.

Notable people

Dustin May (born 1997), MLB player

References

External links
 City of Justin official website
 Justin Journal, newspaper
 Northwest ISD Website

Dallas–Fort Worth metroplex
Cities in Texas
Cities in Denton County, Texas
Populated places established in 1848
1848 establishments in Texas